Dieback may refer to a number of plant problems and diseases including:
 Forest dieback caused by acid rain, heavy metal pollution, or imported pathogens
 The death of regions of a plant or similar organism caused by physical damage, such as from pruning
 Those caused by the genus Eutypa, such as Eutypa dieback
 Those caused by the genus Phytophthora, such as Phytophthora cinnamomi dieback
 Those caused by the genus Seiridium, such as Seiridium cardinale dieback or cypress canker
 Birch dieback, caused by several pathogens
 Ash dieback, caused by Hymenoscyphus fraxineus
 Lettuce dieback
 Maize/corn anthracnose top dieback